Pradal may refer to:

Places 
 Le Pradal, a commune in southern France

People with the surname 
 Bruno Pradal (1949–1992), French actor
 Manuel Pradal (1964–2017), French screenwriter and film director
 Philippe Pradal (born 1963), French politician

See also 
 Pradal serey, an unarmed martial art and combat sport from Cambodia